Giz or GIZ may refer to:

People 
 Giz Watson (born 1957), Australian politician
 Bülent Giz (born 1925), Turkish footballer
 Sadık Giz (1911–1979), Turkish politician
 nickname for Gisele Lagace (born 1970), webcomic author and artist*''

Other uses 
 Deutsche Gesellschaft für Internationale Zusammenarbeit, the German Federal Enterprise for International Cooperation
 Jizan Regional Airport, in Saudi Arabia
 South Giziga language